The following is a list of English Defence League (EDL) demonstrations:

Demonstrations

References

Demonstrations